Hargrave River may refer to:

 Hargrave River (Manitoba)
 Hargrave River (Nunavut)

See also 
 Hargrave (disambiguation)